The XI Army Corps was a military formation belonging to the Spanish Republican Army that fought during the Spanish Civil War. During the war it was deployed on the fronts of Aragon, Segre and Catalonia.

History 
The unit was created in June 1937, within the Eastern Army. It was made up of the divisions 26th, 27th and 32nd, having its headquarters in Sariñena. It covered the front line that ran from the south of Huesca —in union with the X Army Corps - to the Ebro river — where, in turn, it united with the XII Army Corps. During the following months some of its forces intervened in the Zaragoza and Belchite offensives, which, however, did not bear the desired results.

In the spring of 1938, during the Aragon campaign, the forces of the XI Army Corps were unable to cope with the pressure of the nationalist units. By early April, the remnants of the army corps had established their positions along the defensive line of the Segre river. During the following months it did not take part in relevant military operations, reorganizing its battered forces after the withdrawal in Aragon. After the beginning of the Catalonia campaign, they maintained resistance in their defensive positions, some units managing to offer strong opposition —as was the case with the 26th Division. Despite this, the enemy pressure did not subside and at the beginning of 1939 the XI Army Corps was forced to withdraw towards the French border along with the rest of the Eastern Army.

Command 
 Commanders
 Alfonso Reyes González-Cárdenas;
 Antonio Gil Otero;
 Bartolomé Muntané Cirici;
 Francisco Galán Rodríguez;
 Manuel Márquez Sánchez de Movellán;

 Commissars
 Juan Manuel Molina Mateo, of the CNT;
 Julián Muñoz Lizcano, of the PSOE;

 Chiefs of Staff
 Ricardo Clavería Iglesias;
 Mariano Fernández Berbiela;
 Antonio Muñoz Lizcano;

Order of Battle

Notes

References

Bibliography 
 
 
 
 
 
 
 
 

Military units and formations established in 1937
Military units and formations disestablished in 1939
Corps of Spain
Military units and formations of the Spanish Civil War
Military history of Spain
Armed Forces of the Second Spanish Republic
1937 establishments in Spain
1939 disestablishments in Spain